The Linones were a small Slavic people first recorded in the early 9th century. They lived north and east of the Elbe, across from Höhbeck in the region around Lenzen, south of the Wilzi and Obotrites, north of the Hevelli and northeast of the Saxons. They may have been a sub-group of the Wilzi and were often under Obotrite control. They may be associated with the medieval Gau Liezizi.

The Annals of Lorsch classifies the Linones as Wends. According to the Royal Frankish Annals, in 808 the Linones and Smeldingi "defected" to the Danish king Gudfred and in response the Frankish king Charles the Younger ravaged their lands. It is probable that the Linones submitted to Danish authority and cooperated in the Danes' attack on the Obotrites that year, which resulted in the destruction of the emporium of Reric. The language of the Annals implies that they had previously recognized Frankish suzerainty. Rather than come to the aid of their Obotrite allies directly, by attacking the Danes, the Franks launched a punitive expedition against the weaker Linones and Smeldingi, who were both more accessible and more immediately threatening as they lived on the border of the Frankish empire. The army, led by the Emperor Charlemagne's son in person, was probably drawn mainly from Neustria. While the Royal Frankish Annals depicts a Frankish victory, the Annals of Lorsch suggests a serious check or reverse with heavy losses followed by retreat. The Chronicle of Moissac confirms that Charles suffered serious losses. The response of the Danes, who sued for peace, suggests that the Frankish expedition was nonetheless a successful show of force.

In 811, following the annual spring assembly, Charlemagne sent another punitive expedition against the Linones. The army also rebuilt the fortress of Höhbeck, which the Wilzi had destroyed in 810. The Linones may have been involved in that attack. According to the Chronicle of Moissac, the lands of the Bechelenzi were also devastated in 811.

In later records, the Linones are mentioned sporadically in association with the Obotrites. In 838, Louis the German rebelled against the Emperor Louis the Pious, while King Horik I of Denmark demanded that the emperor transfer authority over the Obotrites to Denmark. A general uprising among the Elbean Slavs followed. The Obotrites, Wilzi, Linones, Sorbs and Colodices are said to have taken part. In 839, according to the Annals of Saint-Bertin, Louis the Pious dispatched an army composed of Austrasians and Thuringians against the Obotrites and Linones. In 858, according to the Annals of Fulda, King Louis the German sent an army under his son Louis the Younger against the Obotrites and Linones. This was perhaps connected with a Danish attack on Saxony mentioned in the Annals of Saint-Bertin.

The Linones are one of the peoples listed in the Catalogue of Fortresses and Regions to the North of the Danube, which was produced at the court of Louis the German between 844 and 862, most likely in 845. The peoples living on the frontier of Louis's kingdom are listed from north to south. The Linones, "who have seven fortresses", come after the Wilzi and before the Bechelenzi, Smeldingi and Morizani (who are grouped together).

Notes

Bibliography

Polabian Slavs